Todorova Island is the triangular ice-covered island extending 1 km in southwest–northeast direction and 450 m in southeast–northwest direction, separated from the southwest coast of Belding Island in Biscoe Islands by a 1.2 km long passage narrowing to 80 m at points. Its surface area is 26.2 ha. The feature was formed as a result of the retreat of Belding Island's ice cap in 2011–2012.

The island is named after Katya Todorova, Deputy Foreign Minister responsible for Antarctica and member of the Antarctic Place-names Commission (2001–2005), participant in the Bulgarian Antarctic Expedition during the 2002/03 season.

Location

Maps
 British Antarctic Territory. Scale 1:200000 topographic map. DOS 610 Series, Sheet W 66 66. Directorate of Overseas Surveys, UK, 1976
 Antarctic Digital Database (ADD). Scale 1:250000 topographic map of Antarctica. Scientific Committee on Antarctic Research (SCAR). Since 1993, regularly upgraded and updated

See also
 List of Antarctic and subantarctic islands

Notes

References
 Todorova Island. SCAR Composite Gazetteer of Antarctica
 Bulgarian Antarctic Gazetteer. Antarctic Place-names Commission. (details in Bulgarian, basic data in English)

External links
 Todorova Island. Adjusted Copernix satellite image

Islands of the Biscoe Islands
Bulgaria and the Antarctic